Mistress of Paradise is a 1981 American TV movie starring Genevieve Bujold.

Plot
A woman marries a plantation owner.

Cast
Geneviève Bujold as Elizabeth Beaufort
Chad Everett as Charles Beaufort
Anthony Andrews as Buckley
Olivia Cole as Victorine
Lelia Goldoni as Peg
Carolyn Seymour as Adele
John McLiam as Nathan Mackay
Myron Natwick as Dr Slocum
Fred D. Scott as Franklin
Bill Wiley as Captain Tyler
Tonea Stuart as Sister Sarah
Valarian Smith as Jimmy

References

External links

Mistress of Paradise at BFI
Mistress of Paradise at TCMDB

1981 television films
1981 films
American television films
Films directed by Peter Medak
1980s English-language films